Caractère, which translates into English as "Character", is the second album by French R&B and hip hop singer Kayliah. It was released on August 24, 2007 by Parlophone.

Track listing

Personnel 
Adapted from AllMusic.

 Kayliah 
 Jacky Brown 
 Demon One "Intouchable"
 D.O.C
 Dry 
 Lino
 Oumar Mafoi
 Pierre Mafoi
 Alibi Montana
 Nabil
 Jean-Pierre Chalbos – Mastering
 Chris Chavenon – Mixing
 Tom Coyne – Mastering
 Erwan Quinio – Engineer, Mixing
 Daniel Romero – Basse

Charts

References 

2007 albums